Chris Campbell may refer to:

 Chris Campbell (artist) (born 1952), American artist
 Chris Campbell (wrestler) (born 1954), American wrestler
 Chris Campbell (golfer) (born 1975), Australian golfer
 Christian Campbell (cornerback) (born 1995), American football cornerback
 Chris Campbell (diplomat), British diplomat
 Christopher Campbell, Assistant Secretary of the Treasury for Financial Institutions
 Christian Campbell (born 1972), Canadian-American actor, writer, and photographer
 Christian Campbell (poet) (born 1979), Trinidadian-Bahamian poet, essayist and cultural critic
 Chris Campbell (politician), member of the Indiana House of Representatives